Molecular Biotechnology is a peer-reviewed scientific journal published by Springer Science+Business Media. It publishes original research papers and review articles on the application of molecular biology to biotechnology. It was established in 1994 with John M. Walker as founding editor-in-chief. Prof Aydin Berenjian is the current editor-in-chief of the journal.

Abstracting and indexing 
The journal is abstracted and indexed in:
 
 Science Citation Index Expanded
 PubMed/MEDLINE
 Scopus
 Inspec
 Embase
 Chemical Abstracts Service
 CAB International
 Academic OneFile
 AGRICOLA
 Biological Abstracts
 BIOSIS Previews
 EI-Compendex
 Elsevier BIOBASE
 Food Science and Technology Abstracts
 Global Health
 PASCAL

External links 
 

English-language journals
Biotechnology journals
Publications established in 1994
Springer Science+Business Media academic journals
1994 in biotechnology
9 times per year journals